Whitefield Township may refer to the following townships in the United States:

 Whitefield Township, Marshall County, Illinois
 Whitefield Township, Kandiyohi County, Minnesota